The Personal History of David Copperfield is a 2019 comedy-drama film written and directed by Armando Iannucci, based on the 1850 novel David Copperfield by Charles Dickens. It stars Dev Patel as the title character, along with Aneurin Barnard, Peter Capaldi, Morfydd Clark, Daisy May Cooper, Rosalind Eleazar, Hugh Laurie, Tilda Swinton, Ben Whishaw and Paul Whitehouse.

The world premiere was at the Toronto International Film Festival on September 5, 2019 and was theatrically released in the United Kingdom on January 24, 2020 by Lionsgate and in the United States on August 28, 2020 by Searchlight Pictures.

Plot 
David Copperfield is born to his widowed mother, Clara, and begins saving noteworthy quotes from his life on scraps of paper. As a child, he visits his nanny Peggotty's family in their upturned boathouse in Yarmouth and returns to find Clara has married the strict Mr. Murdstone. Bullied by his new step-aunt and beaten by his stepfather, David is sent to work in Murdstone's bottling factory in London, where he lodges with the Micawber family, who are always cheerful but pursued by their creditors.

As a young man, David still works at the factory, while the Micawbers are evicted by bailiffs and sent to debtors' prison. Informed of his mother's death only after her funeral, David wreaks havoc in the factory and departs for Dover to find his wealthy aunt Betsey Trotwood, his only living relative. Her lodger, the eccentric Mr. Dick, believes himself to be burdened with the late King Charles I’s thoughts and, like David, jots them down. David attaches these notes to a kite for Mr. Dick to fly, helping clear his mind, and meets Betsey's accountant Mr. Wickfield (who likes his wine) and his daughter Agnes. 

Admitted to a school for boys, David is befriended by classmate James Steerforth, who calls him Daisy and believes him to be a gentleman. Later, a butcher's lad mocks the two friends and David challenges him to a fight - David gets knocked out. Agnes tends to his wounds but David disappoints her by saying he thinks of her as a sister. Mr. Micawber briefly joins the school as a teacher, but is exposed by Steerforth as a former convict and fired. Mr. Wickfield's clerk Uriah Heep, who has previously been mocked by the boys, tries to blackmail David with knowledge of his past. At a farewell party at school, David meets Steerforth's mother, ignores his future employer, and falls in love with a somewhat ditsy girl named Dora Spenlow. He is hired as a trainee lawyer with Dora's father's firm in London, where he lives the life of a "young gentleman" and courts Dora.

Betsey arrives in London with Mr. Dick, having lost her fortune and home, and David is forced to decamp with them to a slum dwelling offered by Uriah, who has been keeping Mr. Wickfield drunk and persuaded him to make him a partner. Uriah is also courting Agnes. David visits Pegotty's family in their boat-house with Steerforth, who runs away with Pegotty's adopted daughter Emily, leaving her longtime fiancé Ham. Mr. Micawber now lives on the streets with his family and has pawned his beloved concertina, which he asks Mr. Dick to buy back. Instead, Mr. Dick steals it for him, and David invites the Micawbers to move in with him, Betsey, and Mr. Dick.

David begins to write the story of his life as a book, using the fragments he has saved since childhood. Agnes asks David, Micawber, Betsey, and Mr. Dick for a letter written by Mr. Wickfield as evidence of Uriah’s misdeeds. They confront Uriah, who has been embezzling funds — including Betsey’s missing fortune — by forging Mr. Wickfield's signature, presenting the letter as proof. David punches Uriah after the villainous clerk strikes Betsey, and dismisses him. Recognising that she no longer fits in David's "story", Dora calls off their engagement, asking him to write her out of his book.

Emily is spotted in London and confronted by Steerforth’s mother, but rescued by David and Pegotty’s family. She reveals that Steerforth abandoned her in France, but he will return the following day to Yarmouth. When a storm wrecks Steerforth’s boat off the Yarmouth beach, Ham swims out on a line, but Steerforth refuses to be rescued and is drowned. Mourning his feckless friend’s death, David realises he is in love with Agnes, who reciprocates. He publishes his book to great success, performing public readings of his story. His new career as a writer allows him to buy back Betsey’s home for her and Mr. Dick and continue to support the Micawbers, and he and Agnes marry and have a daughter.

Cast

Production 

It was announced in February 2018 that Armando Iannucci would be writing, directing, and producing a new adaptation of the Charles Dickens novel. Iannucci wrote the screenplay with co-writer Simon Blackwell. Dev Patel was cast in the title role later that month. In April, the supporting cast was added, which included Tilda Swinton, Hugh Laurie, Aneurin Barnard, Ben Whishaw and Morfydd Clark. In May 2018, Peter Capaldi was cast to play Mr. Micawber and pre-production was underway.

Filming began in June 2018 in Norfolk and Suffolk, with Gwendoline Christie, Benedict Wong, Paul Whitehouse, and Daisy May Cooper joining the cast. Scenes were shot in Hull, Bury St Edmunds, Weybourne and King's Lynn in July. Aimee Kelly was added to the cast the same month. Principal photography on the film concluded in August 2018.  In filming David Copperfield, it became the first theatrical film production of the novel in 50 years, as well as the first on-screen adaptation in 19 years.

Release 
The film had its world premiere at the Toronto International Film Festival on 5 September 2019, followed by its European premiere on 2 October 2019, acting as the opening film of the 63rd BFI London Film Festival. It was the Surprise Film at the 39th Cambridge Film Festival. It was released in the United Kingdom by Lionsgate on 24 January 2020. In August 2019, Fox Searchlight Pictures acquired North American rights to the film and scheduled the release on 8 May 2020. However, due to the impact of the COVID-19 pandemic on cinema and the name Searchlight Pictures which was changed by Disney, it was theatrically released later on 28 August 2020.

Reception

Box office 
The Personal History of David Copperfield has grossed $1.9 million in the United States and Canada, and $12.5 million in other territories, for a worldwide total of $14.4 million, against a production budget of $15.6 million. This was during the COVID-19 pandemic when cinemas restricted opening, so is not a reflection of how much it might have made at another time. 

In the United States, it debuted $520,000 from 1,360 cinemas. Playing in 1,550 cinemas the following weekend it fell 24% to $361,000.

Critical response 
The website's critics consensus reads: "The Personal History of David Copperfield puts a fresh, funny, and utterly charming spin on Dickens' classic, proving some stories truly are timeless." On Metacritic, the film has a weighted average score of 77 out of 100, based on 39 critics, indicating "generally favourable reviews". PostTrak reported that 74% of audience members gave the film a positive score, with 50% saying they would recommend it.

Writing for The Observer, Mark Kermode awarded the film a full five stars and stated: "It really is a wonderfully entertaining film, managing to both respect and reinvent the novel from which it takes its lead."

Accolades

References

External links 
 
 
 
 

2019 comedy-drama films
2019 films
American comedy-drama films
British comedy-drama films
Films based on David Copperfield
Films directed by Armando Iannucci
Films postponed due to the COVID-19 pandemic
Films shot in England
Films shot in Norfolk
Films shot in Suffolk
Films shot in Yorkshire
Films with screenplays by Armando Iannucci
Film4 Productions films
Searchlight Pictures films
2019 comedy films
2010s English-language films
2010s American films
2010s British films